Harry van der Linden is a Dutch philosopher and Emeritus Professor of Philosophy at Butler University. He is known for his works on Kantian ethics and is the editor of Radical Philosophy Review.

Works
 Kantian Ethics and Socialism, Hackett Publishing Company 1988

References

21st-century American philosophers
Philosophy academics
Living people
Butler University faculty
Washington University in St. Louis alumni
University of Groningen alumni
Utrecht University alumni
Year of birth missing (living people)